Illiana Christian High School is a private Christian school in Dyer, Indiana.

History
Illiana Christian was founded in 1945 as a school for the children of Dutch Reformed immigrants in the area.

The original campus was located at 2261 Indiana Avenue in Lansing, Illinois.

In September 1987, a student shot and wounded a teacher at the school. The student, who had been removed from the soccer team for smoking cigarettes on campus, shot the teacher who turned him in.

In March 2014, Illiana decided to move to St. John, Indiana (approximately 12 miles to the southeast). The reasons given for the move include the need for larger and more modern facilities and grounds as well as the migration of many of the school's families to Northwest Indiana. On April 21, 2016, the Illiana Christian High School Association purchased a 37 acres site in St. John for $833,208.75. On November 5, 2016, groundbreaking for the new school property located on the corner of 109th Ave and Calumet Ave (also known as "Shoe Corner") in Hanover Township was held.

The new campus opened with the beginning of the 2018-19 school year.

Academics
Illiana Christian has been accredited by the North Central Association since 1996.

Demographics
The demographic breakdown of the 472 students enrolled for 2017-18 was:
Asian - 2.5%
Black - 18.6%
Hispanic - 4.9%
White - 74.0%

Athletics
Illiana Christian's Vikings do not belong to an athletic conference as of the 2019-20 school year. The school colors are hunter green, black and white. The following Indiana High School Athletic Association (IHSAA) sanctioned sports are offered:

Baseball (boys) 
Basketball (girls and boys) 
Cross country (girls and boys)
Golf (boys and girls) 
Soccer (girls and boys) 
Softball (girls) 
Tennis (girls and boys)
Track and field (girls and boys) 
Volleyball (girls) 
Wrestling (boys and girls)

Illiana's boys cross country team took second overall at the Illinois High School Association (IHSA) 2A state meet in 2013.

References

Educational institutions established in 1945
Schools in Lake County, Indiana
Christian schools in Indiana
1945 establishments in Illinois